Biosocial can refer to:
 Biosocial behavior
 Biosocial criminology
 Sociobiology